Daniel Turek (born 19 January 1993 in Lanškroun) is a Czech cyclist, who currently rides for UCI Continental team .

Major results

2010
 1st  Time trial, National Junior Road Championships
2012
 3rd Time trial, National Under-23 Road Championships
2013
 10th Overall Carpathian Couriers Race
2014
 2nd Road race, National Under-23 Road Championships
 6th Tour Bohemia
 8th Overall Carpathian Couriers Race
 10th GP Czech Republic, Visegrad 4 Bicycle Race
2015
 1st Stage 4 Tour d'Azerbaïdjan
 1st Stage 1 Tour de Berlin
 2nd Road race, National Under-23 Road Championships
2016
 3rd Overall Tour de Hongrie
 5th Overall Sibiu Cycling Tour
1st  Mountains classification
 5th Overall Tour de Beauce
 5th Poreč Trophy
 7th GP Kranj
 8th Overall Grand Prix Cycliste de Saguenay
2017
 1st  Mountains classification Okolo Slovenska
 4th Gran Premio di Lugano
2018
 8th Overall Tour of Taihu Lake
 10th Overall Czech Cycling Tour
2019
 1st  Mountains classification Vuelta a Asturias
 8th Overall Tour of Norway
 9th Overall Tour of Taihu Lake
2020
 2nd Overall Dookoła Mazowsza
 5th Time trial, National Road Championships
 5th Overall Bałtyk–Karkonosze Tour
 9th Overall Course de Solidarność et des Champions Olympiques
2021
 1st  Mountains classification Sibiu Cycling Tour
 1st Stage 1 Oberösterreich Rundfahrt
 1st Stage 3 Circuit des Ardennes
 2nd GP Czech Republic, Visegrad 4 Bicycle Race
 3rd Road race, National Road Championships
 6th International Rhodes Grand Prix
 7th Overall International Tour of Rhodes
 9th Overall À travers les Hauts-de-France
2022
 1st  Mountains classification Tour of Antalya

References

External links

1993 births
Living people
Czech male cyclists
European Games competitors for the Czech Republic
Cyclists at the 2015 European Games
People from Lanškroun
Sportspeople from the Pardubice Region